Simge Tertemiz (born 9 September 1988) is a Turkish model, actress and television hostess.

Life and career 
Born in the city of İskenderun in southeastern Turkey and is one of 3 children. She studied at Yahya Kemal Beyatlı Primary School and Nuri Cıngıllıoğlu High School. At the moment she is studying Economics and Industry Relations at Anadolu University (Eskişehir). She was the winner at the 2002 "Best Model of Turkey" and fourth at 2004 "Best Model of The World" modeling pageants. She hs acted as Gamze in the "Çılgın Dersane" movies She also acted in "Mert İle Gert" on TRT 1 (Turkish national network). She was voted as the sexiest woman in Turkey of 2011 by  Boxer Magazine, the country's most widely read men's magazine.

References

External links 

1988 births
Living people
People from İskenderun
Turkish film actresses
Turkish television actresses
Turkish female models